Men was a 1918 American silent drama film directed by Perry N. Vekroff based upon a play by Harry Sophus Sheldon. It starred Anna Lehr, Charlotte Walker, and Robert Cain. It is considered to be a lost film.

Plot
As described in the Exhibitors Herald, a film magazine of the time, the plot was the following. Laura Burton (Lehr) refuses the love of an honest artist to accept the flattering attentions of Roger Hamilton (Cain), a society pet. In due time, however, she finds that she has been betrayed and returns to her mother (Walker). She reads of Hamilton's engagement to Alice Fairbanks (McCoy) who, in reality, is her sister adopted by the Fairbanks in childhood. Laura and her mother arrive in time to prevent the completion of the ceremony. Hamilton is denounced, Alice is free to marry the man she loves, and the young artist returns to claim Laura.

Cast
Anna Lehr as Laura Burton
Charlotte Walker as Mrs. Burton
Robert Cain as Roger Hamilton
Gertrude McCoy as Alice Fairbanks
Willette Kershaw as Mrs. Fairbanks
Ida Darling as Mrs. Hamilton
William H. Tooker as George Fairbanks (credited as William Tooker)
Huntley Gordon as Tom Courtney
Bradley Barker as Anthony Gerard
Fred Radcliffe as Doctor Forbes
Eugene Acker

Reception
Like many American films of the time, Men was subject to restrictions and cuts by city and state film censorship boards. For example, the Chicago Board of Censors issued an Adults Only permit and cut, in Reel 6, the bridegroom shooting man. The board later rescinded the Adults Only permit after an agreement to make these additional changes, which modified the plot of the film: Reel 3, insert new intertitle "We will steal quietly away and be married", replace intertitle "Soon when we are married" with "It will be necessary to keep our marriage secret until the objections of my family are overcome", Reel 4, replace intertitle "I can deceive my mother no longer — when are we to be married?" to "I can deceive my mother no longer, when is our marriage to be announced?", replace intertitle "My family still objects, I can never marry you" to "Our marriage is not legal", Reel 5, during conversation between mother and daughter insert new intertitle "My husband has deceived me with a mock marriage" or words to that effect, and cut scene of bridegroom shooting man.

References

External links
 
 

1918 films
Silent American drama films
American silent feature films
American black-and-white films
American films based on plays
Films directed by Perry N. Vekroff
Lost American films
1918 drama films
1918 lost films
Lost drama films
1910s American films